Lizlee Ann "Tatan" Gata-Pantone (born 17 August 1988) was a Filipino volleyball player who last played for PLDT Home Fibr of the 2019 PSL Grand Prix Conference. 

She was a member of the collegiate varsity volleyball team of Adamson University in both indoor and beach volleyball. She played for PLDT Home Ultera Ultra Fast Hitters where she helped the team in winning multiple championships. Pantone was also a member of Philippines national team. She holds the record in the UAAP with the most number of digs and receptions in a single game tallying 77 excellent digs and 63 excellent receptions.

Career
Gata-Pantone studied at Adamson University. She was dubbed as the Legendary Libero. During her collegiate years, she received multiple awards such as Best Digger and Best Receiver in the UAAP Volleyball Championship and Most Valuable Player in the UAAP Beach Volleyball Championship. 

Gata-Pantone played the 2013 Asian Championship with her national team.

She won the Filipino competition 2016 MVP Olympics in the volleyball tournament with PLDT Home Ultera Ultra Fast Hitters. She signed with BaliPure Purest Water Defenders for the 2017 Premier Volleyball League 1st Season Reinforced Open Conference.

In 2021, PLDT Home Fibr Hitters coach, Roger Gorayeb, confirmed that Pantone retired from volleyball.

Awards

Individuals
 Shakey's V-League Season 4 Second Conference "Best Digger"
 Shakey's V-League Season 5 First Conference "Best Digger"
 Shakey's V-League Season 5 Second Conference "Best Digger"
 Shakey's V-League Season 6 First Conference "Best Digger"
 Shakey's V-League Season 6 Second Conference "Best Receiver"
 Shakey's V-League Season 7 First Conference "Best Digger"
 UAAP Season 70 "Best Digger"
 UAAP Season 71 "Best Digger"
 UAAP Season 72 Beach Volleyball "Most Valuable Player"
 UAAP Season 73 Beach Volleyball "Most Valuable Player"
 UAAP Season 72 "Best Digger"
 UAAP Season 72 "Best Receiver"
 2014 PSL All-Filipino Conference "Best Libero"
 Shakey's V-League 11th Season Open Conference "Best Receiver"
 Shakey's V-League 11th Season Reinforced Open Conference "Best Digger"
 Shakey's V-League 12th Season Reinforced Open Conference "Best Libero"
 2018 Premier Volleyball League Reinforced Conference "Best Libero"

Collegiate
 Shakey's V-League Season 5 First Conference –  Champion, with Adamson Lady Falcons
 Shakey's V-League Season 6 First Conference –  Bronze medal, with Adamson Lady Falcons
 Shakey's V-League Season 6 Second Conference –  Silver medal, with Adamson Lady Falcons
 UAAP Season 72 Beach Volleyball Tournament –  Champion, with Adamson Lady Falcons
 Shakey's V-League Season 7 First Conference –  Champion, with Adamson Lady Falcons
 UAAP Season 70 volleyball tournaments –  Silver medal, with Adamson Lady Falcons

Clubs
 2013 PSL Grand Prix –  Bronze medal, with PLDT myDSL Speed Boosters
 2014 PSL All-Filipino Conference –  Bronze medal, with PLDT Home TVolution Power Attackers
 2014 Shakey's V-League 11th Season Open Conference –  Bronze medal, with PLDT Home Telpad Turbo Boosters
 2014 Shakey's V-League 11th Season Reinforced Open Conference –  Bronze medal, with PLDT Home Telpad Turbo Boosters
 2015 Shakey's V-League 12th Season Open Conference –  Champions, with PLDT Home Ultera Ultra Fast Hitters
 2015 Shakey's V-League 12th Season Reinforced Open Conference –  Champions, with PLDT Home Ultera Ultra Fast Hitters
 2017 Premier Volleyball League 1st Season Reinforced Open Conference –  Silver medal, with BaliPure Purest Water Defenders
 2017 Premier Volleyball League 1st Season Open Conference –  Champions, with BaliPure Purest Water Defenders
 2018 Premier Volleyball League Reinforced Conference –  Silver medal, with PayMaya Highflyers

References 

1988 births
Living people
Women's beach volleyball players
University Athletic Association of the Philippines volleyball players
Adamson University alumni
Philippines women's international volleyball players
Filipino women's volleyball players
Liberos
Sportspeople from Sorsogon
21st-century Filipino women